Prostřední Bludovice is a village and administrative part of Horní Bludovice in Karviná District in the Moravian-Silesian Region of the Czech Republic. As of 2021 it had 1,349 inhabitants.

Populated places in Karviná District